John Rodney Buckmaster (18 July 1915 – 1 April 1983) was an English actor on the stage, in films and on television, and a cabaret singer-songwriter. He was the son of actress Gladys Cooper (1888–1971) and Captain Herbert Buckmaster (1881–1966). Educated at Eton College, he followed his mother into the acting profession and worked on both sides of the Atlantic. 

During World War II, he served for a time as a private in the United States Army Air Forces before resuming his acting career until the mid-1950s. He suffered increasingly from mental illness, which led to his confinement at the Priory Hospital, where he committed suicide on 1 April 1983.

Early life
John Buckmaster was born on 18 July 1915 in Frinton-on-Sea where his mother, Gladys Cooper, had bought a cottage. Most people had fled from Frinton at the start of World War I, but Cooper kept her daughter Joan (b. 1910) and baby John there in the care of a nanny, Sarah Aves, while she herself stayed in London to be near the theatre and going down to be with them at weekends. His father, Herbert John Buckmaster—a veteran of the Boer War known as "Buck", who founded Buck's Club and would later put the 'Buck' into Buck's Fizz—enlisted as soon as the war started and was given a commission in the 12th Reserve Regiment of Cavalry. After an initial posting in Aldershot, he went to France with the Royal Horse Guards in early 1915, where he remained for three-and-a-half years. During the war, Cooper wrote daily to her husband, giving him regular updates on their two children, including their son's stages of development from infant to toddler and little boy. 

She continued to be widely photographed on picture-postcards in which her children also featured. At the end of the war, the couple found that they had drifted apart; they divorced amicably on 12 December 1921 and remained close friends for the rest of their lives.

Throughout his childhood, Buckmaster was regularly reported in the Press as an interesting and decorative news item. At the age of seven, a picture shows him dressed as a naval cadet and carrying a telescope under one arm. At nine he stands, racket in hand, beside his mother at the Frinton Juvenile Lawn Tennis Tournament, in which he was the youngest boy competitor. A year later, with boxing gloves on, he is facing the ex-welterweight champion of Europe, Johnny Summers, who had taught him for two years, and with whom he sparred at the Brighton Hospital Tournament in July 1925. On 14 June 1927, Cooper married Sir Neville Pearson, and gave birth to their daughter, Sally, in  1929. Buckmaster, now at Eton College, found the second marriage difficult to accept and became a difficult teenager; though handsome, witty and talented, he was sensitive and highly strung. Of Cooper's three children, he was emotionally closest to his mother and proved deeply affected by her remarriage, as he and Pearson disliked each other intensely.

In early 1934, when his mother left England to expand her stage career into North America, Buckmaster moved to a flat in Chelsea with his nanny, Sarah Aves, to keep home for him. While in the US, Cooper met and eventually married Philip Merivale on 30 April 1937, after obtaining a divorce from Pearson on 16 October 1936. They lived mainly in California and worked extensively in both Hollywood and Broadway, also supporting the Red Cross British Relief Fund and running a small theatre for servicemen during World War II. Buckmaster was very fond of his stepfather upon whose death, on 12 March 1946, he wrote a tribute poem and left it on his mother's desk one morning.

Career
One of Buckmaster's earliest appearances on stage was in J. M. Barrie's The Admirable Crichton at the age of eight. After its dress rehearsal, Sybil Thorndike had declared he was "the best actor I have seen." 

At twenty, Buckmaster had already been performing professionally for a year when, in 1935, he played Georges Dupont in Robert E. Sherwood's English adaptation of Jacques Deval's 1933 play Tovarich at the Lyric Theatre, where it ran for 414 performances and where the wardrobe mistress was Mrs Mott ("Motty")his mother's dresser for over twenty years. The same year, he played Mike Doyle in George Pearson's film Checkmate, based on the novel by Amy Kennedy Gould.

During the first half of 1936, Buckmaster moved to New York to join his mother and Philip Merivale in Call It a Day, a Dodie Smith family comedy in which he played the son of his mother's character. As a handsome and talented young actor, he had inherited her gift for mimicry that later put him in the top flight of cabaret artists on Broadway, and seemed poised to follow her success on the stage. At the end of 1938, Buckmaster was playing the part of Lord Alfred Douglas in Norman Marshall's production of Oscar Wilde. In the title role of this play, Robert Morley—who became Buckmaster's brother-in-law after marrying his sister Joan on 23 February 1940—had made something of a sensation, repeating on Broadway the performance he had given at the little Gate Theatre in London a year earlier. During this period, Buckmaster and Morley shared a flat in New York and got on very well.

  

In early September 1939, Cooper wrote to her daughter Joan in England that "John and Jack  are thinking of joining up in Canada. John has been writing awfully good songs lately, and making quite a name for himself in cabaret" although, by Christmas 1939, she added that she was "managing to send Johnnie some money now and again." In July 1940, not having seen her son for 18 months, Cooper drove east to Central City, Colorado where he was performing in cabaret. During his act, she was introduced as "John Buckmaster's mother", which he said made a nice change from him always being known as "Gladys Cooper's son".

By the Spring of 1943, Buckmaster had enlisted as a private in the United States Army Air Forces, and composed a song he contributed to one of the Service magazines shortly after he joined. His stepbrother Jack Merivale was flying for the Royal Canadian Air Force, and both of them spent time at the family home in California when they were on leave.

In 1946, Cooper decided to launch the stage career of her youngest daughter Sally Pearson ( Sally Cooper), who played Lady Agatha Carlisle in a successful Broadway production of Oscar Wilde's Lady Windermere's Fan, which included her half-brother (Buckmaster) as Lord Darlington and her stepbrother (Merivale) as Sir James Royston.

During the late 1940s and up to the mid-1950s, Buckmaster remained in the US, performing in plays such as: An Inspector Calls (1947–1948), Caesar and Cleopatra (1949–1950), Getting Married (1951), and Saint Joan (1951–1952). These stage performances were interspersed with TV appearances in a handful of plays and films, a test for the role of Caligula in The Robe in February 1953, and character roles in two episodes of the 1954 Sherlock Holmes TV series, with Ronald Howard in the lead role. At this point, Buckmaster's acting career ended with the worsening of his mental illness.

Personal life

From the beginning of his stage career, Buckmaster featured regularly in gossip columns as the escort of up-and-coming young actresses such as Vivien Leigh and Jean Gillie. Leigh later told Jack Merivale that, in August 1935 while married to Herbert Leigh Holman, her first affair had been with Buckmaster. 

At Vivien Leigh's insistence, Buckmaster—who seemed to know everyone in the theatre—introduced her to Laurence Olivier in the autumn of 1935 at the Savoy Grill, where he and his first wife Jill Esmond dined regularly after his performance in Romeo and Juliet. Buckmaster and Leigh had another brief affair in 1953.  

In Gladys Cooper's family tree, Buckmaster's entry shows that he never married, nor had any children.

Mental illness and death
In the summer of 1945, when they were both on leave at the family home in California, Jack Merivale noticed uneasiness in Buckmaster's relationship with his mother: "Whenever I'm with her, I feel I'm always doing the wrong thing, whatever it is."

At the end of the Lady Windermere's Fan run in the spring of 1947, Buckmaster suffered the first of the regular mental breakdowns which became increasingly violent over the following decade, even though shock treatment was at first successful in containing his acute schizophrenia. In his 1979 biography of Gladys Cooper, her grandson Sheridan Morley summarised the presumed causes of Buckmaster's condition:

In February 1952, Buckmaster, having just finished a highly successful and critically acclaimed Broadway run as the Dauphin in St Joan, had the worst and most violent of his mental breakdowns. Accused of molesting women on the corner of Madison Avenue and 67th Street at 7 am, he was chased through the streets of Manhattan, arrested, and charged with felonious assault and the illegal possession of two knives which he was alleged to have brandished at the police. He was committed to the Bellevue Hospital for a psychiatric check, and then transferred to the State Hospital for the mentally ill at Kings Park, Long Island, from where his release was eventually secured by Jack Merivale and Noël Coward.

In mid-March 1953, Buckmaster visited Vivien Leigh, who was filming Elephant Walk in Hollywood and had rented a mansion on Hanover Drive, while Olivier was in Ischia on a break from organising theatrical and film events for the Queen's coronation that summer. Leigh was going through one of her psychotic breakdowns at the time and the studio doctor and psychiatrist had organised round the clock care for her, in which David Niven became involved. After Buckmaster had unsuccessfully attempted to persuade Leigh that they could fly out of an upper window together, Niven called Stewart Granger and asked him to intervene by forcibly removing Buckmaster from the house and driving him back to his hotel.

By 1960, Buckmaster was settled into the Priory Hospital where he would spend the rest of his life. He steadfastly declined visits from either of his parents, blaming them for his breakdowns. He committed suicide there on 1 April 1983.

Selected performances

Theatre
 Tovarich, as Georges Dupont (Lyric Theatre, London. October 1935)
 Call It a Day, as Martin Hilton (Morosco Theatre, New York. January 1936 – July 1936)
 Oscar Wilde, as Lord Alfred Douglas (Fulton Theatre, New York. October 1938 – May 1939)
 Lady Windermere's Fan, as Lord Darlington (Cort Theatre, New York. October 1946 – April 1947)
 An Inspector Calls, as Gerald Croft (Booth Theatre, New York. October 1947 – January 1948)
 Caesar and Cleopatra, as Apollodorus (National Theatre, New York. December 1949 – April 1950)
 Getting Married, as St. John Hotchkiss (ANTA Playhouse, New York. May 1951 – May 1951)
 Saint Joan, as The Dauphin (Cort Theatre, New York. October 1951 – January 1952)
 Saint Joan, as The Dauphin (New Century Theatre, New York. January 1952 – February 1952)

Filmography
 Checkmate (1935) as Mike Doyle
 Uncle Dynamite (29 January 1950, The Philco Television Playhouse TV Movie)
 Dirty Eddie (9 April 1950, The Philco Television Playhouse TV Movie)
 The Sun (13 May 1950, The Chevrolet Tele-Theatre TV Movie)
 Blockade (23 March 1951, Pulitzer Prize Playhouse TV Movie)
 "The Case of the Haunted Gainsborough" (4 July 1955, Sherlock Holmes TV Series; Episode 35) as Bartender
 "The Case of the Unlucky Gambler" (18 July 1955, Sherlock Holmes TV Series; Episode 37) as Mac Leis

Explanatory footnotes

References

Citations

Sources

Books

Newspapers and magazines

Websites

External links 

 
 
 
 Copyright registration of "Echo of Paris",  23 July 1940, a song composed by John Buckmaster

1915 births
1983 deaths
People educated at Eton College
1983 suicides
Suicides in England
English male stage actors
English male film actors
20th-century English male actors
Military personnel from Essex
United States Army Air Forces personnel of World War II
United States Army Air Forces soldiers